Temple Moore (1856–1920) was an English architect who practised from an office in London.  He was born in Tullamore, Ireland, and was the son of an army officer.  He was educated at Glasgow High School, then privately.  In 1875, he was articled to George Gilbert Scott, Jr.  Moore set up an independent practice in 1878, but continued to work with Scott for some years, and completed some of his commissions.  Moore's designs were mainly in Gothic Revival style, and although he worked in the later years of that tradition, his "artistic destiny was not to preserve an attenuating tradition but to bring to maturity a development which otherwise would have remained incomplete".  Temple Moore was mainly a church architect, designing some 40 new churches and restoring or making alterations and additions to other churches, but he also designed works of different types, including country houses, memorials, schools, parish halls, and a hospital.  One of Moore's pupils was Giles Gilbert Scott.  In 1919 Moore's son-in-law, Leslie Moore, became a partner, and he continued the work of the practice after Temple Moore's death at his home in Hampstead in 1920.

This list contains a variety of works that are not included in the other lists of Morre's works, which all related to churches.  They contain information about new churches, their restorations, additions, alterations, and their fittings and furnishings.

Key

Works

See also
List of new churches by Temple Moore
List of church restorations and alterations by Temple Moore
List of church fittings and furniture by Temple Moore

References

Bibliography

Moore, Temple